The 1976 NBA draft was the 30th annual draft of the National Basketball Association (NBA). The draft was held on June 8, 1976, before the 1976–77 season. In this draft, 18 NBA teams took turns selecting amateur U.S. college basketball players and other eligible players, including international players. The first two picks in the draft belonged to the teams that finished last in each conference, with the order determined by a coin flip. The Atlanta Hawks won the coin flip and were awarded the first overall pick, while the Chicago Bulls were awarded the second pick. The Hawks then traded the first pick to the Houston Rockets before the draft. The remaining first-round picks and the subsequent rounds were assigned to teams in reverse order of their win–loss record in the previous season. The New York Knicks forfeited their first-round draft pick due to their illegal signing of George McGinnis whose rights were held by the Philadelphia 76ers. The 76ers, the Golden State Warriors and the Buffalo Braves also forfeited their second, third and fourth-round picks respectively due to their participation in 1975 supplementary draft American Basketball Association (ABA) players who had never been drafted in the NBA. A player who had finished his four-year college eligibility was eligible for selection. If a player left college early, he would not be eligible for selection until his college class graduated. Before the draft, 26 college underclassmen were declared eligible for selection under the "hardship" rule. 13 of them withdrew before the draft, leaving only 13 early entry candidates eligible for selection. These players had applied and gave evidence of financial hardship to the league, which granted them the right to start earning their living by starting their professional careers earlier. The draft consisted of 10 rounds comprising the selection of 173 players. On August 8, 1976, the league also hosted a Dispersal draft for ABA players from the Kentucky Colonels and Spirits of St. Louis, who were not included in the ABA–NBA merger.

Draft selections and draftee career notes
John Lucas from the University of Maryland was selected first overall by the Houston Rockets. Adrian Dantley from the University of Notre Dame, who went on to win the Rookie of the Year Award in his first season, was selected 6th by the Buffalo Braves. Four players from this draft, Dantley, 8th pick Robert Parish, 23rd pick Alex English and 29th pick Dennis Johnson, have been inducted to the Basketball Hall of Fame. Parish was also named to the list of the 50 Greatest Players in NBA History announced at the league's 50th anniversary in 1996. Dantley was selected to two All-NBA Teams and six All-Star Games. Parish won three NBA championships with the Boston Celtics in the 1980s. Later in his career, he added another championship in 1997 with the Chicago Bulls. His other achievements include two All-NBA Team selections and nine All-Star Game selections. English's achievements include three All-NBA Team selections and eight All-Star Game selections. Johnson won the NBA championships, along with the Finals Most Valuable Player Award, with the Seattle SuperSonics in 1979. He then won two other championships with the Celtics in the 1980s. He was selected to two All-NBA Teams, five All-Star Games and nine All-Defensive Teams.

Lonnie Shelton, the 25th pick, is the only other player from this draft who was selected to an All-Star Game. Lucas, 22nd pick Johnny Davis and 99th pick Mike Dunleavy all became head coaches after ending their playing career. Lucas has coached three teams in six seasons while Davis has coached three teams in four seasons. Dunleavy won the Coach of the Year Award in 1999 with the Portland Trail Blazers. He coached four teams in 17 seasons. Two other players drafted also went on to have coaching careers in the NBA: Dennis Johnson and seventh pick Quinn Buckner.

Key

Draft

Other picks
The following list includes other draft picks who have appeared in at least one NBA game.

Trades
 On June 7, 1976, the Houston Rockets acquired Dwight Jones and the first pick from the Atlanta Hawks in exchange for Gus Bailey, Joe Meriweather and the ninth pick. The Rockets used the pick to draft John Lucas. The Hawks used the pick to draft Armond Hill.
 On May 29, 1975, the Buffalo Braves acquired a first-round pick from the Phoenix Suns in exchange for a 1975 first-round pick. Previously, the Suns acquired Dennis Awtrey, Nate Hawthorne, Curtis Perry and the pick on September 16, 1974, from the New Orleans Jazz in exchange for Neal Walk and a 1975 second-round pick. The Braves used the pick to draft Adrian Dantley.
 On September 6, 1974, the Golden State Warriors acquired a first-round pick from the Los Angeles Lakers as compensation for the signing of Cazzie Russell as a free agent. The Warriors used the pick to draft Robert Parish.
 On July 30, 1975, the Washington Bullets acquired a first-round pick from the Buffalo Braves in exchange for Dick Gibbs. The Bullets used the pick to draft Mitch Kupchak.
 On October 22, 1975, the Seattle SuperSonics acquired a second-round pick from the Milwaukee Bucks in exchange for Jim Fox. Previously, the Bucks acquired two 1976 second-round picks on June 5, 1975, from the Atlanta Hawks as a compensation when the Hawks illegally signed Julius Erving. Previously the Hawks acquired Bob Kauffman, Dean Meminger, 1974 and 1975 first-round picks, 1975 and 1976 second-round picks, and a 1980 third-round pick on May 20, 1974, from the New Orleans Jazz in exchange for Pete Maravich. The Sonics used the pick to draft Bayard Forrest. The Bucks used the pick to draft Alex English.
 On September 16, 1974, the Portland Trail Blazers acquired Barry Clemens and future consideration (the Blazers acquired a second-round pick on May 25, 1976) from the New Orleans Jazz in exchange for Rick Roberson. Previously, the Jazz acquired Ron Behagen and the pick on May 28, 1975, from the Kansas City Kings in exchange for a 1975 first-round pick. The Blazers used the pick to draft Major Jones.
 On November 3, 1975, the Los Angeles Lakers acquired John Roche and a second-round pick from the Phoenix Suns in exchange for Pat Riley. Previously, the Suns acquired the pick on September 30, 1975, from the Detroit Pistons in exchange for Earl Williams. The Lakers used the pick to draft Earl Tatum.
 On June 3, 1976, the New Orleans Jazz acquired a 1976 second-round pick from the Portland Trail Blazers in exchange for a 1977 second-round pick. Previously, the Blazers acquired the pick on June 9, 1975, from the Phoenix Suns in exchange for Phil Lumpkin. Previously, the Suns acquired the pick and a 1977 third-round pick on November 27, 1974, from the Los Angeles Lakers in exchange for Corky Calhoun. The Jazz used the pick to draft Jacky Dorsey.
 On October 8, 1973, the Atlanta Hawks acquired a 1976 second-round pick and a 1977 third-round pick from the Phoenix Suns in exchange for Bob Christian. The Hawks used the pick to draft Bob Carrington.
 On February 1, 1976, the Phoenix Suns acquired Gar Heard and a second-round pick from the Buffalo Braves in exchange for John Shumate. The Suns used the pick to draft Al Fleming.
 On May 23, 1975, the Phoenix Suns acquired Paul Westphal, 1975 and 1976 second-round picks from the Boston Celtics in exchange for Charlie Scott. The Suns used the pick to draft Butch Feher.
 On December 8, 1975, the Chicago Bulls acquired a 1977 second-round pick and a 1976 third-round pick from the Kansas City Kings in exchange for Matt Guokas. The Bulls used the pick to draft Lars Hansen.

Early entrants

College underclassmen
The following college basketball players successfully applied for early draft entrance.

  Norm Cook – F, Kansas (junior)
  Charles Daniels – G, Rice (junior)
  Adrian Dantley – F, Notre Dame (junior)
  Johnny Davis – G, Dayton (junior)
  Jack Dorsey – F, Georgia (sophomore)
  Edward Douglas – F, Rutgers–Newark (sophomore)
  Daryl Gainey – F, Fairmont State (junior)
  Reggie Glasgow – G, UC Irvine (junior)
  Loy Hudson – F, Albany State (junior)
  Warnel Lamb – F, Lehigh County CC (sophomore)
  Lonnie Shelton – F, Oregon State (junior)
  Richard Washington – F, UCLA (junior)
  Larry Wright – G, Grambling State (junior)

ABA dispersal draft

On August 5, 1976, the NBA hosted a dispersal draft to select players from the Kentucky Colonels and Spirits of St. Louis, the American Basketball Association (ABA) franchises that were not included in the ABA–NBA merger. The eighteen NBA teams and the four ABA teams that joined the NBA, the Denver Nuggets, Indiana Pacers, New York Nets and San Antonio Spurs, were allowed to participate in the draft. The teams selected in reverse order of their win–loss percentage in the previous NBA and ABA seasons. The team that made a selection must pay a certain price for the signing rights to the player, which are set by the league's committee. The money from the draft was used to help the four ABA teams that merged with the NBA to pay off some of their obligations to the two folded ABA franchises, the Colonels and the Spirits. The team that made a selection must assume the player's ABA contract. Players who were not selected would become free agents.

Twenty players from the Colonels and the Spirits were available for the draft. Eleven were selected in the first round and the twelfth player was selected in the second round. Eight players were not selected and thus became a free agent. The Chicago Bulls used the first pick to select five-time ABA All-Star Artis Gilmore with a signing price of $1,100,000. The Portland Trail Blazers, who acquired the Atlanta Hawks' second pick, selected Maurice Lucas and Moses Malone with signing price of $300,000 and $350,000 respectively. Marvin Barnes, who was selected fourth by the Detroit Pistons was the second most expensive player in the draft with a signing price of $500,000. Several teams elected to pass their first-round picks and only the Kansas City Kings used the second-round pick. The draft continued until the third round, but no other players were selected.

Trades
 On the draft-day, the Portland Trail Blazers acquired the second pick from the Atlanta Hawks in exchange for Geoff Petrie and Steve Hawes. The Blazers used the pick to draft Maurice Lucas.
 On the draft-day, the Buffalo Braves acquired the seventh pick from the Milwaukee Bucks in exchange for a 1977 second-round pick. The Braves used the pick to draft Bird Averitt.

Notes

See also
 List of first overall NBA draft picks

References
General

Specific

External links
NBA.com
NBA.com: NBA Draft History

Draft
National Basketball Association draft
NBA draft
NBA draft
1970s in Manhattan
Basketball in New York City
Sporting events in New York City
Sports in Manhattan
Madison Square Garden